Noel McKernan (born 4 December 1945) is a former  Australian rules footballer who played with North Melbourne in the Victorian Football League (VFL).

Notes

External links 

Living people
1945 births
Australian rules footballers from Melbourne
North Melbourne Football Club players
Preston Football Club (VFA) players